Lipsker (also Lipskar, Lipskier) is a Yiddish surname. Notable people with the surname include:
Avidov Lipsker (born 1949),  Israeli professor of Hebrew Literature
 (1921-2010), German Jewish businessman, member of the board of directors of the Central Council of Jews in Germany 
Sholom Ber Lipsker (born 1946), American Chabad rabbi

See also

Lipskerov

Yiddish-language surnames